The South Branch of the Souhegan River is a  river located in northern Massachusetts and southern New Hampshire in the United States. It is a tributary of the Souhegan River, which flows to the Merrimack River and ultimately to the Gulf of Maine.

The South Branch begins near Mount Watatic at the outlet of Stodge Meadow Pond in the town of Ashburnham, Massachusetts, and flows north through a chain of small lakes (Marble Pond, Ward Pond, and Watatic Pond) before turning northeast into the town of Ashby, Massachusetts. North of Ashby, the river enters New Ipswich, New Hampshire, passes through a small flood control reservoir, and joins the West Branch to form the Souhegan River, just north of the intersection known as "Gibson Four Corners".

See also

List of rivers of Massachusetts
List of rivers of New Hampshire

References

Tributaries of the Merrimack River
Rivers of Worcester County, Massachusetts
Rivers of New Hampshire
Rivers of Massachusetts
Rivers of Hillsborough County, New Hampshire